The 2014 Malaysia FAM League (referred to as the FAM League) is the 62nd season of the Malaysia FAM League since its establishment in 1952. The league is currently the third level football league in Malaysia. Penang are the defending champions and currently play in the second level of Malaysian football, Malaysia Premier League.

Kuantan FA won the league with two matches to spare, their first title in their 2-year FAM League participation, after a 1-1 draw with MOF F.C. on 20 June 2014, while Kuala Lumpur FA clinched second place with one match to spare, after a 2-1 win over Perak YBU F.C. on 25 June 2014. Both teams gain promotion to 2015 Malaysia Premier League as a result.

Teams
The following teams will be participate in the 2014 Malaysia FAM League. In order by the number given by FAM:-

  Kuala Lumpur FA (Relegated from 2013 Malaysia Premier League)
  MOF F.C. (New Team)
  YBU FC
  Kuantan FA
  Malacca United SA
  Shahzan Muda SC
  PB Melayu Kedah
  Cebagoo FC
  Harimau Muda C
  Sungai Ara F.C. (New Team)
  MISC-MIFA (New Team)
  Hanelang F.C. (New Team)

To Malaysia Premier League

  Penang FA
  PBAPP FC

New Team

 MISC-MIFA
 MOF F.C.
 Sungai Ara
 Hanelang

Team Withdrawing
 Tumpat FA
 Tentera Darat FC
 NS Betaria FC (Relegated from 2013 Malaysia Premier League)

Team summaries

Stadium

Personnel and kits
Note: Flags indicate national team as has been defined under FIFA eligibility rules. Players and Managers may hold more than one non-FIFA nationality.

League table

Results

Week 1

Week 2

Week 3

Week 4

Season statistics

Top scorers

Own goals

Hat-tricks

See also

 2014 Malaysia Super League
 2014 Malaysia Premier League
 2014 Malaysia Cup
 2014 Malaysia FA Cup

References

External links
 Football Association of Malaysia

2014
4